Lauter is a river of Baden-Württemberg, Germany. It originates near Degenfeld. It is a right tributary of the Fils in Süßen.

See also

 List of rivers of Baden-Württemberg

References

External links
 

Rivers of Baden-Württemberg
Rivers of Germany